This comparison of Standard Mandarin transcription systems comprises a list of all syllables which are considered phonemically distinguishable within Standard Mandarin. 

Gwoyeu Romatzyh employs a different spelling for each tone, whereas other systems employ tone marks or superscript numerals.

Comparison table

See also 
 Romanization of Chinese
 Transcription into Chinese characters
 Pinyin table

Notes 

 
Comparisons